is a passenger railway station located in the city of Akashi, Hyōgo Prefecture, Japan, operated by the West Japan Railway Company (JR West).

Lines

Station layout
The station consists of two ground-level island platforms connected by an elevated station building, and a siding westbound track without a platform in the south of Track 4. The station has a Midori no Madoguchi staffed ticket office

Platforms

Adjacent stations

|-
!colspan=5|JR West

History
Ōkubo Station opened on 23 December 1888. With the privatization of the Japan National Railways (JNR) on 1 April 1987, the station came under the aegis of the West Japan Railway Company.

Station numbering was introduced in March 2018 with Ōkubo being assigned station number JR-A75.

Passenger statistics
In fiscal 2019, the station was used by an average of 20,001 passengers daily

Surrounding area
 Okubo O's Town
 Akashi City Okubo Junior High School
 Akashi City Okubo Elementary School
 Akashi City Okubo Minami Elementary School

See also
List of railway stations in Japan

References

External links

 JR West Station Official Site

Railway stations in Japan opened in 1888
Railway stations in Hyōgo Prefecture
Sanyō Main Line
Akashi, Hyōgo